Mirela Krasimirova Demireva (born 28 September 1989) is a Bulgarian high jumper.

Career
Demireva did not reach the final at the 2006 World Junior Championships, but won the silver medal at the 2008 World Junior Championships. She was again knocked out in the first round at the 2011 European U23 Championships.

At the senior level she finished eighth at the 2012 European Championships and seventh at the 2013 European Indoor Championships. She also competed at the 2013 World Championships without reaching the final.

At the Olympic Games in Rio de Janeiro 2016 Demireva won a silver medal, jumping 1.97 m. She also won two consecutive silver medals at the European Championships (2016–18). Demireva was the 2016 Bulgarian Sportsperson of the Year and came in second place during the 2018 edition of the award.

Achievements

References

1989 births
Living people
Bulgarian female high jumpers
World Athletics Championships athletes for Bulgaria
European Athletics Championships medalists
Athletes (track and field) at the 2016 Summer Olympics
Olympic athletes of Bulgaria
Olympic silver medalists for Bulgaria
Olympic silver medalists in athletics (track and field)
Medalists at the 2016 Summer Olympics
Sportspeople from Sofia
Athletes (track and field) at the 2020 Summer Olympics
21st-century Bulgarian women